Madhusudan Narhar Deshpande  (11 November 1920 – 7 August 2008), was an Indian archaeologist, art historian and conservator who served as Director General of the Archaeological Survey of India from 1972 to 1978.

Early life 
Deshpande was born into a Deshastha Brahmin family in the village of Rahimatpur in the Satara district of the then Bombay Presidency. He did his schooling in Poona and graduated with honours from Fergusson College in 1942. Deshpande did his post graduate research at the Deccan College under H. D. Sankalia on "The Cultural History of India based on Jain Canonical Literature and Archaeology" but before completion, he was selected by Mortimer Wheeler to undergo training in field archaeology in the School of Archaeology at Taxila.

Books

References

Bibliography
 

1920 births
2008 deaths
Directors General of the Archaeological Survey of India
20th-century Indian archaeologists
Indian art historians
People from Satara district
Scientists from Maharashtra
Indian institute directors